Bourg-Blanc is a commune in the Finistère department of Brittany in north-western France.

Population
Inhabitants of Bourg-Blanc are called Blanc-Bourgeois in French.

See also
Communes of the Finistère department
List of the works of the Maître de Thégonnec

References

External links

 Official website 

 Mayors of Finistère Association  

Communes of Finistère